The Mathematical Treatise in Nine Sections is a mathematical text written by Chinese Southern Song dynasty mathematician Qin Jiushao in the year 1247. The mathematical text has a wide range of topics and is taken from all aspects of the society of that time, including agriculture, astronomy, water conservancy, urban layout, construction engineering, surveying, taxation, armament, military and so on.

This book contains nine chapters:
Da Yan type (Indeterminate equations);
Heaven phenomena
Area of land and field
Surveying
Taxation
Storage of grains
Building construction
Military matters
Price and interest.
Each chapter contains nine problems, a total of 81 problems.
Apart from describing Chinese Remainder Theorem for the first time and providing a constructive proof for it, the text investigated:
Indeterminate equations
"Linglong method" (roughly "method of harmoniously alternating evolution") for numerical solution of algebraic equations, 570 years before Horner's method
Areas and volumes of geometric objects and
Linear system

Like many traditional Chinese mathematical works, the text reflects a Confucian administrator's concern with more practical mathematical problems, like calendrical, mensural, and fiscal problems.

The text existed  in manuscript form in 1247, it was incorporated into The Yongle Encyclopedia in 1421; in 1787 the book was collected into Siku Quanshu, in 1842 appeared in woodblock printed edition. The 19th century British Protestant Christian missionary Alexander Wylie in his article Jottings on the Sciences of Chinese Mathematics published in North China Herald 1852, was the first person to introduce Mathematical Treatise in Nine Sections to the West. In 1971 Belgian sinologist  Ulrich Libbrecht published his doctorate dissertation, Chinese Mathematics in the Thirteenth Century, which earned him a degree cum laude at Leiden University.

Notes

References
Guo, Shuchun, "Qin Jiushao". Encyclopedia of China (Mathematics Edition), 1st ed.
Siku Quanshu edition of the book - 數學九章 (四庫全書本)

Song dynasty literature
Chinese mathematics
Mathematics manuscripts
1247 works
Treatises
13th-century Chinese books